Salehi is an Iranian surname. Notable people with the surname include:

 Ali Akbar Salehi, Iranian academic and politician
 Alvin Salehi, an American technology entrepreneur, attorney and angel investor
 Ataollah Salehi, Iranian general
 Djavad Salehi-Isfahani, Iranian economist
 Jahan Salehi, Iranian-American entrepreneur
 Jawad Salehi, Iranian electrical and computer engineer
Nouria Salehi, Afghan-Australian nuclear physicist and humanitarian
Parastoo Salehi, Iranian actress
Salehi, Pro player in Dota 2
Toomaj Salehi, Iranian rapper

See also
 Salahi (disambiguation)

Iranian-language surnames